Touch My Blood is the third album released by South African rapper AKA. released on 15 June 2018 through Beam Group in partnership with NYCE Entertainment. It is his first independent release and is the follow-up to his sophomore album, Levels. It features guest appearances from fellow South African artists including L-Tido, JR, Yanga Chief, Stogie T, Kwesta & Okmalumkoolkat, as well as a sole international appearance by Nigerian artist and producer Kiddominant. Production is handled by AKA, Master A Flat, Tweezy, Tazzy, Kiddominant, Anatii, Gemini Major, DJ Maphorisa, Makwa, Buks and additional production by Julian McGuire. Touch My Blood was certified Gold by the Recording Industry of South Africa (RiSA) on 25 June 2018, just one week into its release. On 9 November 2018, the album was certified platinum by RiSA four months after its release.

Artwork and title
On 20 April 2018, AKA announced a "Touch My Blood Challenge" for an internship opportunity at Beam Group. He invited members of the "Megacy", a name he has given his fanbase, to design the cover of the album which will be titled Touch My Blood. The winner of the challenge was promised a one-year internship at Beam Group.
He instructed: 

On 8 May 2018, the official artwork of the album and the winner of the challenge was announced. Beam Group's & AKA's Design Team (Nicky Heat & Johnny Malepa) won the challenge with their front cover, and Taonga, a visual artist from Rustenburg, North West was the runner-up of the challenge and received an internship at Beam Group. Furthermore, his artwork was featured as the back cover for the album.

Release and promotion
Touch My Blood was originally set for release on 25 May 2018. AKA announced on social media that the new album would be pushed back for release until 15 June 2018, because he needed more time to shoot videos, release singles, drop merchandise and confirm tour dates.

Giant billboards were deployed around the city of Johannesburg to promote and build hype for the album release. He took to Twitter to share some of the images of the "Touch My Blood" billboards and also called on his followers to share those they come across with him.

Singles
On 2 December 2016, AKA released the album's first single, "The World Is Yours". The music video for the song was later released on 2 February 2017 and was shot in Thailand while he was on vacation with then girlfriend, Bonang Matheba. The song topped the charts and has been certified triple Platinum by the Recording Industry of South Africa.

Track listing
Credits were adapted from the album's liner notes.

Notes
  signifies an additional producer
 "Daddy Issues II" features additional vocals from AKA's daughter, Kairo.

Sample credits
 "Amen" contains a sample of "This Is Goodbye", as performed by Hollis P Monroe.
 "Sweet Fire" contains an interpolation of "Fire, Passion & Ecstasy", as performed by Ray Phiri & Stimela.
 "Fela in Versace" contains an interpolation of "Shibobo", as performed by TKZEE from the album Guz Hits.
 "The World Is Yours" contains a sample of "Løb Stop Stå" as performed by Boom Clap Bachelors from the EP MELLEM DINE LÆBER.
 "Me and You" contains an interpolation of "Raf" as performed by ASAP Mob (featuring ASAP Rocky, Playboi Carti, Quavo, Lil Uzi Vert & Frank Ocean), as well as an interpolation of "Mr. Loverman" as performed by Shabba Ranks.

Personnel
Adapted from the album liner notes.

 AKA – vocals; executive producer 
 Anatii – production 
 Buks – production 
 DJ Maphorisa – production 
 Gemini Major – production 
 Julian McGuire – additional production 
 Kiddominant — production 
 Master A Flat – executive producer; production 
 Ningi Poro - mix assistant
 Prince Costinyo – executive producer
 Robin Kohl – mixing
 Tazzy – production 
 The Homies – executive producer
 Tweezy – production

Release history

Certifications

References 

2018 albums
AKA (rapper) albums
Albums produced by Kiernan Forbes
Albums produced by Tweezy
Albums produced by DJ Maphorisa
Albums produced by Kiddominant